Nicolas Rémy Maire (1800–1878) was an illustrious French archetier.

Maire was born in Mirecourt.  He trained in the Lafleur workshop and served  his apprenticeship  in the workshop of Pajeot in Mirecourt. Maire's style remained close to that of Pajeot.

He opened his own workshop in Mirecourt in 1826 and left in 1853 to work in Paris. As well as his own production, he worked for Gand, Jean Baptiste Vuillaume and Georges Chanot. He was influenced by Dominique Peccatte during the 1850s, his bows being very similar to those of Peccatte from this period. Maire went on to a lighter model after 1860, as did many other makers of his time. He did not always stamp his bows. Jean Joseph Martin was among his students. His work varies in style but is consistently of fine craftsmanship.  He died in Paris.

References 

 
 
 
 Les Luthiers Parisiens aux XIX et XX siecles Tom 3 "Jean-Baptiste Vuillaume et sa famille - Sylvette Milliot 2006
 
 

1800 births
1878 deaths
Bow makers
19th-century French people
Luthiers from Mirecourt